James Stephen Rigaud (1726 – 16 April 1814), also known as Stephen Rigaud, was an astronomer of the 18th century.

Life
His parents were Pierre Rigaud and Anne Unice Mestre.

Stephen Rigaud became Assistant Observer to Dr Stephen Demainbray at the King's Observatory, built near Richmond Lodge for the 1769 Transit of Venus. In 1771 he married Deminbray's daughter Mary at St Mary Magdalene's Church, Richmond. going on to live at 5 Old Palace Terrace in the town. They had two children, Mary Anne and Stephen Peter Rigaud, later an astronomer and mathematical historian. Mary Anne and Stephen Peter were painted by John Francis Rigaud in 1778 – they are posed in a park landscape with Kew Observatory in the background and although the painting is sometimes described as showing Richmond Park the topography makes it more likely that it shows the Old Deer Park, which surrounds the Observatory. Rigaud died in 1814 and is buried in the Vineyard Passage Burial Ground near the church where he had married.

References

18th-century British astronomers
1726 births
1814 deaths
Burials at Vineyard Passage Burial Ground